Do It Right may refer to:

 Do It Right (album), by SHINEmk
 "Do It Right" (Martin Solveig song), a 2016 single
 "Do It Right" (Anne-Marie song), a 2015 single by Anne-Marie

See also
 Doing It Right (scuba diving)